Urelu is a small town in Sri Lanka. It is located within Northern Province. Urelu is located south of Punnalaikkadduvan, west of Achchelu east of Chunnakam and north of Urumbrai.

See also
List of towns in Northern Province, Sri Lanka

External links

Towns in Jaffna District
Valikamam East DS Division